Reform School Girls is the soundtrack album for the 1986 film of the same name. It was released in 1986 by Rhino Records. The soundtrack features mostly hard rock and heavy metal songs. Wendy O. Williams contributed four songs to the soundtrack; "It's My Life" from her debut studio album WOW (1984), "Bad Girl" and "Goin' Wild" from her second album Kommander of Kaos (1986), and the title song "Reform School Girls" recorded for the film. Williams herself appears in the film as a reform school bully Charlie Chamblis. Other artists on the album, consisting only of female singers and bands, include Etta James, Girlschool, Screamin' Sirens and Girl's Night Out.

Track listing

References

External links 

1986 soundtrack albums
Comedy film soundtracks